Noorderkempen is a railway station near the town of Brecht, Antwerp province, Belgium. The station opened on 15 June 2009 on the HSL 4 high speed line between the Netherlands and Belgium. The train services are operated by National Railway Company of Belgium (NMBS) and Nederlandse Spoorwegen (NS).

The station makes the Northern Kempen region connected to the rail network via the HSL 4 route and is the only true high-speed station in Belgium. However, it is not served by any true high-speed train, functioning rather as a park and ride for Antwerp and to a lesser extent Breda. The Thalys services (300km/h) skip the station as the IC services (160km/h - 200km/h) serve the station.

History
The station was due to open in September 2007 but this and several other deadlines were not met. The main reason given for this was the ECTS signalling not being approved for use. The station was opened in 2009 and is served by shuttle services between the station and Antwerp.

International services to the Netherlands have started calling at this station in April 2018. Services are timetabled to depart at the same time in each direction (1 minute past the hour), to facilitate bus connections.

Train services
The following services currently the serve the station:

Intercity services (IC-15) Noorderkempen - Antwerp
Intercity Direct International 9200 Brussels-Midi - Amsterdam Centraal

References

External links

 

Railway stations opened in 2009
Railway stations in Belgium
Railway stations in Antwerp Province
Brecht, Belgium